"A Saucerful of Secrets" is a multi-part instrumental composition by progressive rock band Pink Floyd from their 1968 album of the same name. It is nearly 12 minutes long and was composed by Roger Waters, Richard Wright, Nick Mason and David Gilmour. The track features guitar feedback, a percussion solo section and wordless vocals.

Background
"A Saucerful of Secrets" was titled "The Massed Gadgets of Hercules" in its earliest performance and became a Pink Floyd live staple from 1968 to 1972. A live version of the track is available on their 1969 double album Ummagumma, and an alternative version is seen and heard in the film Pink Floyd: Live at Pompeii, which was performed at director Adrian Maben's request, as he thought it would be a good addition to the film.

The track was composed by Roger Waters drawing diagrams on a piece of paper explaining how the music should progress. Gilmour later said he initially wasn't sure what to play.

Live performances of the song differed significantly from the studio version. The closely miked cymbal sound that starts the piece was instead performed as a two-note drone on the bass. For the "Syncopated Pandemonium" section, Richard Wright usually played his Farfisa organ instead of pounding a grand piano with his fists as on the studio recording (the version on Pompeii being an exception). The "Celestial Voices" section started with just organ as per the studio version, but gradually added drums, bass, guitar and wordless vocals, provided by David Gilmour.

The Japanese release of this song was simply titled , which translates as "Mystery". The album A Saucerful of Secrets itself also carried this title.

The song was Gilmour's first songwriting credit with Pink Floyd. On the original vinyl and early CD issues, his name was misspelled as "Gilmore". This was corrected with the remastered version released in 1994.

Structure
Although the song is listed on all pressings of the album as "A Saucerful of Secrets", some pressings of Ummagumma break the piece into four different sections. The first part, "Something Else", was logged as "Richard's Rave Up" when the song was recorded at EMI Studios. The second part was recorded as "Nick's Boogie" before being retitled as "Syncopated Pandemonium", while the last part is titled "Celestial Voices". Roger Waters once stated in a Rolling Stone interview that the song was about a battle and the aftermath. "Something Else" represents the setup of the battle. "Syncopated Pandemonium" represents the actual battle. "Storm Signal" represents the view of the dead after the battle has ended, and "Celestial Voices" represents the mourning of the dead.

"Something Else" (0:00–3:57, slow closely miked cymbal fade-in and echoing organ, slide guitar, bass, chimes, piano, vibraphone)
"Syncopated Pandemonium" (3:57–7:04, drum tape loop, cymbals, distorted guitars, piano)
"Storm Signal" (7:04–8:38, floor tom, chimes, and organ) in the form of a passacaglia over a 16-bar bass line, continuing into the fourth section until the end of the piece
"Celestial Voices" (8:38–11:52, bass, organ, piano, chimes, mellotron and wordless chorus)

Live performances
Pink Floyd performed the instrumental in 1968–72, with the last performance taking place on 23 September 1972 at the Winterland Auditorium, San Francisco, California. It was regularly performed as an encore throughout that year. Nick Mason and Wright briefly considered resurrecting the instrumental for the 1987 Momentary Lapse of Reason tour, but Gilmour suggested that it sounded too archaic.
In the version found on Live at Pompeii: Directors Cut, Mason's drumming is much faster and also featured in the last two sections. Gilmour sings for only the last chord progression, instead of for the last two.
The Ummagumma live version is only slightly longer than the studio version at 12:48, and is less freeform noise than its studio counterpart.
Live performances of the instrumental initially had a length of about 12–13 minutes, but later performances commonly ran for about 17–20 minutes.
"Syncopated Pandemonium", the second part of the track, was one of the many tracks which were played at some point or another as "Doing It" (part of the conceptual concert The Man and The Journey, the focus of their 1969 tour). Others include "The Grand Vizier's Garden Party (Entertainment)", "Up the Khyber", "Party Sequence". All of these prominently feature drums.
The "Celestial Voices" section was used as the finale to The Man and the Journey concept suite, renamed to "The End of the Beginning". At a performance of the suite on 26 June 1969 at the Royal Albert Hall, Pink Floyd were joined by a full brass band and choir for the piece. Rick Wright played the Royal Albert Hall pipe organ and the work ended with a very loud recorded explosion. 
 "A Saucerful of Secrets" has been performed by Nick Mason's Saucerful of Secrets since 2018.

Personnel
David Gilmour – slide guitar, vocals
Richard Wright – Farfisa organ, Hammond organ, Mellotron, piano, vibraphone, vocals
Roger Waters – bass guitar, cymbals, vocals
Nick Mason – drums, chimes

Cultural references
 The album The Dark Side of the Moog II (1994) by Klaus Schulze and Pete Namlook is subtitled "A Saucerful of Ambience".

References

Pink Floyd songs
1968 songs
Rock instrumentals
Songs written by David Gilmour
Songs written by Nick Mason
Songs written by Richard Wright (musician)
Songs written by Roger Waters